Anthyllis hermanniae, called the lavender-leaved anthyllis, is a species of flowering plant in the family Fabaceae. It is found in Anatolia, Greece, the Balkans, and many Mediterranean islands, including Corsica. Coleophora hermanniella, a species of moth found only on Corsica, feeds exclusively on A.hermanniae. A low perennial shrub, it is cultivated as a garden plant, and was formerly cultivated as far north as the United Kingdom, until the great frost of 1739 wiped them out there.

A. hermanniae is typically 1.5–2 feet tall, with crooked or zig-zag branches. The leaves are simple or trifoliate, with soft silky hairs (more on the underside than the top). This plant grows in a variety of habitats, but requires good drainage, often growing in rocky locations. It produces yellow flowers in late spring-early summer.

Subspecies

Currently accepted subspecies are:
Anthyllis hermanniae subsp. brutia Brullo & Giusso
Anthyllis hermanniae subsp. corsica Brullo & Giusso
Anthyllis hermanniae subsp. ichnusae Brullo & Giusso
Anthyllis hermanniae subsp. japygica Brullo & Giusso
Anthyllis hermanniae subsp. melitensis Brullo & Giusso
Anthyllis hermanniae subsp. sicula Brullo & Giusso

References

hermanniae
Garden plants of Europe
Flora of Corsica
Flora of Southeastern Europe
Flora of the East Aegean Islands